The Walden String Quartet was a chamber music ensemble formed in 1934 by members of the Cleveland Orchestra.
It was originally the idea of violinist Homer Schmitt and cellist Robert Swenson, who met in 1927. They recruited violinist Bernard Goodman and violist Leroy Collins for the original group.
The viola chair changed many times until John Garvey joined in 1948.

By 1935 the quartet were featured in half-hour network radio programs.

In March 1936, at the Cleveland Museum of Art, the quartet gave its first concert. In accord with their policy of emphasizing modern composers, the program included the Hindemith String Quartet No 4, and quartets by composers Quincy Porter and Normand Lockwood. By 1945, they had performed in over 70 radio programs and given 27 concerts at the museum.

The quartet had several affiliations with educational institutions. For a while they were known as the "Walden Quartet of Cleveland College",
referring to the adult education campus of Western Reserve University. In 1946 they became quartet-in-residence at Cornell University. The next year, following the move of Cornell's head of music to the University of Illinois, they became quartet-in-residence at that school with academic appointments, a first in the United States. The quartet remained there until it disbanded in the late 1970s.

In 1949, the quartet was selected by the civil affairs division of the U.S. war department
to tour Austria and Germany, as well as Brussels, Amsterdam, Paris, and finally London,
where they performed Quartet No.2 by Wallingford Riegger and Charles Ives's Second String Quartet.

The group premiered many 20th Century works including Elliott Carter's String Quartet No. 1, which was dedicated to them.

Recordings

References 

American string quartets
1934 establishments in Ohio
Musical groups established in 1934